The 1996–97 Indy Racing League was the second season contested by the Indy Racing League. Tony Stewart was the champion, while Arie Luyendyk won the Indianapolis 500. The lengthy season was a result of the league abandoning the concept of ending each season with the Indianapolis 500. The 1996–97 season would ultimately consist of the two races that followed the Indy 500 in the calendar year of 1996, and all events contested in the calendar year of 1997. It also saw the introduction of a new chassis and engine package.

The 1996–97 season was originally scheduled to begin at New Hampshire in August 1996 and end with the Indianapolis 500 in May 1997. At some point in the summer of 1996, the consensus regarding the unusual split-calendar season was decidedly unfavorable. Omitting the normal winter offseason caused potential difficulty with driver contracts, sponsor contracts, and equipment purchasing, which all traditionally followed a calendar-based schedule. In addition, the months of November, December, and most of January were not expected to be filled with race dates, since few suitable venues (outside of Orlando) were available in warm-weather locations. It was felt the long winter gap between races was disruptive and disjointed, and came at a time of year when auto racing was traditionally on hiatus anyway.

Following the 1996 races at New Hampshire and Las Vegas, on October 9, 1996, the Indy Racing League announced that the league would revert to a calendar-based schedule for 1998. To avoid awarding four championships in less than two and a half years, all events contested in the calendar year of 1997 were added to the two aforementioned races held in 1996. Now combined, a single seventeen-month 1996–1997 championship would be awarded in October 1997.

The two remaining races in 1996 (New Hampshire and Las Vegas) were contested with the same equipment as the 1996 season. All races that took place in the calendar year of 1997, starting with the race at Orlando, were contested with all new purpose-built oval chassis from G-Force and Dallara with stock block naturally aspirated 4.0 liter V8's from Oldsmobile and Infiniti. Only seven drivers competed in all ten races of this seventeen-month-long marathon schedule.

Confirmed entries

Season Summary

Schedule 

All races running on Oval/Speedway.

After the 1996 prologue-style, 3-race season that ended at the 80th Indianapolis 500, the 1996–97 season had just two further races in calendar year 1996, at New Hampshire International Speedway, a former CART venue, and a barely inaugurated Las Vegas Motor Speedway. On 9 October 1996, the IRL decided to revert to a calendar-based format for 1998, moving the intended end of the 1996–97 season at Indianapolis in May to Las Vegas in October.

For calendar year 1997, all five races from 1996 were held again, alongside three further races, contested consecutively in the summer months after the Indianapolis 500. Two new venues, Texas Motor Speedway and Pikes Peak International Raceway, was followed by IRL's first incursion in a NASCAR foothold, the Charlotte Motor Speedway. Texas and Charlotte held the first night races in Indy-car history, and became the first 1.5 mile banked oval racetracks in an Indy-car schedule since Atlanta Motor Speedway in 1983.

Race results

Race summaries

True Value 200
The True Value 200 was held on August 18, 1996 at New Hampshire International Speedway. Richie Hearn qualified on the pole position.

Top 10 results
 1 – Scott Sharp
 12 – Buzz Calkins
 33 – Michele Alboreto
 10 – Mike Groff
 14 – Davey Hamilton
 21 – Roberto Guerrero
 40 – Marco Greco
 22 – Stéphan Grégoire
 7 – Eliseo Salazar
 18 – John Paul Jr.
Failed to qualify: 24-Randy Tolsma, 25-Jon Field, 64-Johnny Unser, 75-Johnny O'Connell and 96-Mike Orday
Sharp's first IndyCar win.
The win was also the first for A. J. Foyt Enterprises since A. J. Foyt won the 1981 Van Scoy Diamond Mines 500 at Pocono International Raceway.
Tony Stewart led for 165 of 200 laps. However, he suffered electrical issues after 182 laps and finished 12th.

Las Vegas 500K (1996)

The Las Vegas 500K was held on September 15, 1996 at Las Vegas Motor Speedway. Arie Luyendyk qualified on the pole position.

Top 10 results
 4 – Richie Hearn
 22 – Michel Jourdain Jr.
 10 – Mike Groff
 21 – Roberto Guerrero
 33 – Michele Alboreto
 12 – Buzz Calkins
 7 – Eliseo Salazar
 54 – Robbie Buhl
 40 – Marco Greco
 34 – Affonso Giaffone
Failed to qualify: 96-Dave Steele
Hearn's only IndyCar win. Because he and his team, Della Penna Motorsports, were switching to CART for 1997, he would not compete in any more IRL races for the remainder of the season.
The slow pace of the race, consisting of nine cautions, caused ABC to leave just past the halfway point.
Johnny O'Connell had a violent crash on lap 185 that resulted in him sliding upside down on the main straightaway.
Johnny Parsons' final IndyCar race. He had started IndyCar races since 1969. In this race, he crashed on lap nine and finished 28th (last).

Indy 200
The Indy 200 was held on January 25, 1997 at Walt Disney World Speedway. Tony Stewart qualified on the pole position. The race was shortened from 200 laps to 149 laps due to rain.

Top 10 results
 51 – Eddie Cheever
 10 – Mike Groff
 6 – Scott Goodyear
 1 – Scott Sharp
 91 – Buddy Lazier
 27 – Jim Guthrie
 14 – Davey Hamilton
 22 – Marco Greco
 33 – Fermin Velez
 2 – Tony Stewart
Failed to qualify: 4-Davy Jones
Cheever's first IndyCar win.
Buzz Calkins was leading when his engine failed on lap 145. Stewart took the lead, but crashed on the following lap. Cheever inherited the lead and the race was stopped three laps later.
Danny Ongais' final IndyCar race. He finished 13th due to a crash after 94 laps.

Phoenix 200
The Phoenix 200 was held on March 23, 1997 at Phoenix International Raceway. Tony Stewart qualified on the pole position.

Top 10 results
 27 – Jim Guthrie
 2 – Tony Stewart
 14 – Davey Hamilton
 22 – Marco Greco
 77 – Stéphan Grégoire
 10 – Mike Groff
 21 – Roberto Guerrero
 12 – Buzz Calkins
 18 – John Paul Jr.
 16 – Sam Schmidt
Failed to qualify: 17-Danny Ongais and 54-Robbie Buhl
Guthrie's only IndyCar win. He stretched his fuel over the final 82 laps and the $170,100 payout allowed him to settle off his debts from getting a second mortgage.
Kenny Bräck and Sam Schmidt made their IndyCar debuts in this race. Bräck led 24 laps, but crashed on lap 146 and finished 11th. Schmidt crashed on lap 176, but finished 10th.

Indianapolis 500

The Indianapolis 500 was scheduled for May 25, 1997. Rain postponed the start until the following day: Monday, May 26. After 15 laps were run on Monday, rain fell again, halting the race, and postponing it for another day. It was resumed and run to conclusion Tuesday, May 27. Arie Luyendyk qualified on the pole position.

Top 10 results
 5 – Arie Luyendyk
 6 – Scott Goodyear
 52 – Jeff Ward
 91 – Buddy Lazier
 2 – Tony Stewart
 14 – Davey Hamilton
 11 – Billy Boat
 3 – Robbie Buhl
 30 – Robbie Groff
 33 – Fermin Velez
Failed to qualify: 1-Scott Sharp, 1-Johnny O'Connell, 18-John Paul Jr. and 36-Scott Harrington
On lap 199, the caution came when Stewart brushed the wall and it was expected that the race would end under caution. However, the green flag came out without warning before the final lap and caution lights were still displayed around the track, causing confusion if the race was really restarted.
Treadway Racing's cars finished 1st and 2nd, making it the first time since 1962 with Leader Card Racing that a team finished 1st and 2nd.
The starting grid was expanded from 33 to 35 cars due to the 25/8 rule (which guaranteed the top 25 cars in the IRL standings a starting position, provided they meet a minimum speed) causing cars outside the fastest 33 to qualify. As a result, Lyn St. James and Johnny Unser were added to the rear of the field.
A crash during the pace lap caused all of row 5 (Stéphan Grégoire, Affonso Giaffone and Kenny Bräck) to retire.
Sharp was injured in a practice crash and replaced by O'Connell, who then was injured in practice. Paul Durant successfully qualified via the 25/8 rule (see above) and finished 21st.

True Value 500
The True Value 500 was held June 7, 1997 at Texas Motor Speedway. Tony Stewart qualified on the pole position.

Top 10 results
 5 – Arie Luyendyk
 1 – Billy Boat
 14 – Davey Hamilton
 6 – Scott Goodyear
 2 – Tony Stewart
 51 – Eddie Cheever
 7 – Eliseo Salazar
 97 – Greg Ray
 8 – Vincenzo Sospiri
 10 – Johnny Unser
Failed to qualify: 10-Mike Groff, 36-Scott Harrington, 50-Billy Roe, 77-Stéphan Grégoire and 90-Lyn St. James
Boat was initially declared the winner due to a scoring error. Luyendyk came into victory lane to protest, but was slapped by A. J. Foyt. The error was eventually realized and Luyendyk was declared the winner. Foyt still has the original trophy.
Stewart appeared to be on his way to his first win when his engine blew, causing him to then crash, on lap 207.
Points leader Groff was injured in practice. Unser drove in his place to a 10th-place finish.
In the aftermath of the scoring error, USAC was removed as sanctioning body and the IRL went in-house.

Samsonite 200
The Samsonite 200 was held on June 29, 1997 at Pikes Peak International Raceway. Scott Sharp qualified on the pole position.

Top 10 results
 2 – Tony Stewart
 77 – Stéphan Grégoire
 14 – Davey Hamilton
 51 – Eddie Cheever
 12 – Buzz Calkins
 22 – Vincenzo Sospiri
 6 – Scott Goodyear
 91 – Buddy Lazier
 17 – Affonso Giaffone
 30 – Robbie Groff
Failed to qualify: 3-Robbie Buhl and 27-Jim Guthrie
Stewart's first IndyCar win.
Scott Sharp returned in this race and qualified on the pole position. However, he crashed on the first lap and re-injured himself, missing the rest of the season.
1st race for the IRL race control

VisionAire 500
The VisionAire 500 was held on July 26, 1997 at Charlotte Motor Speedway. Tony Stewart qualified on the pole position.

Top 10 results
 91 – Buddy Lazier
 1 – Billy Boat
 6 – Scott Goodyear
 17 – Affonso Giaffone
 4 – Kenny Bräck
 51 – Eddie Cheever
 2 – Tony Stewart
 77 – Stéphan Grégoire
 70 – Marco Greco
 7 – Eliseo Salazar
Greg Ray's car was run in conjunction with Richard Childress Racing for this race.

Pennzoil 200
The Pennzoil 200 was held August 17, 1997 at New Hampshire International Speedway. Marco Greco qualified on the pole position.

Top 10 results
 3 – Robbie Buhl
 22 – Vincenzo Sospiri
 5 – Arie Luyendyk
 7 – Eliseo Salazar
 4 – Kenny Bräck
 21 – Roberto Guerrero
 18 – John Paul Jr.
 1 – Billy Boat
 51 – Eddie Cheever
 30 – Robbie Groff
Failed to qualify: 10-Mike Groff and 97-Greg Ray
Buhl's first IndyCar win.
Mike Groff was injured once again in practice and missed the remainder of the season.
Entering the season finale at Las Vegas, Tony Stewart led Davey Hamilton by 10 points.

Las Vegas 500K (1997)
The Las Vegas 500K was held on October 11, 1997 at Las Vegas Motor Speedway. Billy Boat qualified on the pole.

Top 10 results
 7 – Eliseo Salazar
 6 – Scott Goodyear
 3 – Robbie Buhl
 27 – Jim Guthrie
 28 – Mark Dismore
 33 – Jimmy Kite
 14 – Davey Hamilton
 19 – Stan Wattles
 77 – Stéphan Grégoire
 70 – Marco Greco
Salazar's only IndyCar win.
Tony Stewart would win the championship by six points over Hamilton by virtue of finishing 11th to Hamilton's 7th.
On lap 201, Roberto Guerrero lost control on the back straightway and flipped through the grass.

Driver standings 

 Ties in points broken by number of wins, followed by number of 2nds, 3rds, etc., and then by number of pole positions, followed by number of times qualified 2nd, etc.

See also 
 1997 Indianapolis 500
 1997 Indy Lights season
 1997 CART season
 1997 Toyota Atlantic Championship season
 http://www.champcarstats.com/year/1996-97.htm
 http://media.indycar.com/pdf/2011/IICS_2011_Historical_Record_Book_INT6.pdf  (p. 148–149)

Footnotes

References

Indy Racing League
Indy Racing League
IndyCar Series seasons
1996–97 in IndyCar
Indy Racing League
Indy Racing League